Andrea Checchi (21 October 1916 – 29 March 1974) was a prolific Italian film actor.

Biography
Born in Florence, Checchi appeared in over 150 films in his lengthy career, which spanned from 1934 to his death in 1974. The son of a painter, he studied painting at the Accademia di Belle Arti di Firenze.  Moved to Rome, he attended the acting course held by Alessandro Blasetti who gave him a small role in 1860. After graduating at the Centro Sperimentale di Cinematografia, he had his first role of weight in the 1940 historical drama film L'assedio dell'Alcazar by Augusto Genina. He later appeared in Mario Camerini's Due lettere anonime (for which he received a Silver Ribbon as best actor), Giuseppe De Santis's Tragic Hunt (1947), Michelangelo Antonioni's La signora senza camelie (1953),  Vittorio De Sica's Two Women (1960), and Mario Bava's  Black Sunday (1960), among many other films.  In 1958, he won the Italian National Syndicate of Film Journalists Award for best supporting actor for his performance in the film Parola di ladro (1957). In 1971, he starred with Giancarlo Giannini in E le stelle stanno a guardare, an adaptation of a novel named A. J. Cronin, The Stars Look Down.

Selected filmography

 1860 (1934) - Another soldier
 Everybody's Woman (1934) - Un amico di Roberto
 The Old Guard (1934) - Pompeo (uncredited)
 Stadium (1934)
 The Last of the Bergeracs (1934)
 The Conquest of the Air (1936) - Zoroastro (uncredited)
 Amore (1936) - Lorenzo
 Bayonet (1936) - attendente del duca
 Luciano Serra, Pilot (1938) - Ten. Binelli
 L'ultima carta (1938) - Carlo Revers
 Under the Southern Cross (1938) - Un'operaio della piantagione
 Ettore Fieramosca (1938) - Gentilino
 La grande luce - Montevergine (1939) - Alberto
 Department Store (1939) - Maurizio
 Piccolo hotel (1939) - Andrea Toth
 The Night of Tricks (1939) - Giorgio Albini
 La conquista dell'aria (1939) - Zoroastro
 Manon Lescaut (1940) - Marius
 È sbarcato un marinaio (1940) - Un cavallerizzo al Luna Park
 Giù il sipario (1940) - Il giovane commediografo
 Incanto di mezzanotte (1940) - Il conte Abbiati
 L'assedio dell'Alcazar (1940) - Perro
 Amiamoci così (1940) - Biagio
 La leggenda azzurra (1940) - Il giovane ricco
 Senza cielo (1940) - Piero Franci
 I pirati del golfo (1940)
The King of England Will Not Pay (1941) - Ippolito Buondelmonti
 Ragazza che dorme (1941) - Gianni
 Schoolgirl Diary (1941) - Il professore Marini
 Brivido (1941) - Mattia Cintra
 Solitudine (1941) - Guido Navarri
 Tragic Night (1942) - Nanni
 Invisible Chains (1942) - Enrico Leni, il fratellastro
 Before the Postman (1942) - Bruno Bellini
 Street of the Five Moons (1942) - Checco
 M.A.S. (1942) - Oscar
 The Countess of Castiglione (1942) - Baldo Princivalli
 Labbra serrate (1942) - Carlo Massani
 Malombra (1942) - Corrado Silla
 Giacomo the Idealist (1943) - Giacinto Magnenzio
 Tempesta sul golfo (1943) - Il capitano Roberto Capece
 The Valley of the Devil (1943) - Il tenente medico Peter Grundel
 Sad Loves (1943) - Fabrizio Arcieri
 Tutta la vita in ventiquattr'ore (1943) - Giulio
 Lacrime di sangue (1944) - Roberto
 Vivere ancora (1945)
 The Ten Commandments (1945) - (segment "Non nominare il nome di Dio invano")
 Lettere al sottotenente (1945) - Il giovane sottotenente
 Two Anonymous Letters (1945) - Bruno
 The Ways of Sin (1946) - Rocco
 Roma città libera (1946) - Il giovane
 A Yank in Rome (1946) - Roberto
 Hotel Luna, Room 34 (1946) - Andrea Esposito
 Biraghin (1946) - Il Giornalista
 Crime News (1947)
 Last Love (1947) - Il capitano Rastelli
 The White Primrose (1947) - Il Poliziotto
 Tragic Hunt (1947) - Alberto
 The Brothers Karamazov (1947) - Ivàn Karamazoff
 Eleonora Duse (1947) - Tebaldo Checchi
 Crossroads of Passion (1948)
 The Earth Cries Out (1949) - Ariè
 The Walls of Malapaga (1949) - Giuseppe, le mari de Marta / Giuseppe, marito di Marta
 Flying Squadron (1949)
 Paolo e Francesca (1950) - Gianciotto Malatesta
 Il cielo è rosso (1950)
 The Accusation (1950) - Il commissario Costantini
 Il sentiero dell'odio (1950)
 The Black Captain (1951) - Fratello Di Marco e Lucrezia
 Love and Blood (1951)
 Schatten über Neapel (1951)
 Attention! Bandits! (1951) - The engineer
 Stormbound (1951) - Rol
 I'm the Hero (1952) - Busatti
 In Olden Days (1952) - Camillo (segment "Meno di un giorno")
 Don Lorenzo (1952) - Carlo
 The Lady Without Camelias (1953)
 If You Won a Hundred Million (1953) - (segment "Il pensionato")
 The Captain of Venice (1951) - Ezzelino da Romano
 Mid-Century Loves (1954) - Gabriele (segment "Girandola 1910")
 A Slice of Life (1954) - Carlo (segment "Gli innamorati")
 Pietà per chi cade (1954) - Andrea Mari
 Appassionatamente (1954) - Antonio
 House of Ricordi (1954) - Giulio Ricordi
 The Two Orphans (1954) - Captain Marrest
 Human Torpedoes (1954) - Giorgio
 Tripoli, Beautiful Land of Love (1954) - Captain Andressi
 Red and Black (1954)
 La campana di San Giusto (1954) - Roberto
 Goodbye Naples (1955) - Frank
 Buonanotte... avvocato! (1955) - Franco, Husband of Bianca Maria
 Rommel's Treasure (1955) - Krikorian
 I quattro del getto tonante (1955) - Cap. Rovi
 Processo all'amore (1955) - Andrea Solari
 Desperate Farewell (1955) - Dott. Maurizio Marini
 The Intruder (1956) - Alberto Serpieri
 I giorni più belli (1956) - Uno degli ex alunni
 Supreme Confession (1956) - Don Diego Garletto
 Operazione notte (1957)
 Terrore sulla città (1957)
 Parola di ladro (1957) - Gabriele Bertinori
 Mattino di primavera (1957) - padre di Marisa
 My Wife's Enemy (1959) - Dr. Giuliani
 Le cameriere (1959) - L'avvocato Arnaldo Guglielmi
 World of Miracles (1959) - Il direttore della fotografia
 Goliath and the Barbarians (1959) - Delfo
 Le notti dei Teddy Boys (1959) - Kommissar
 The Employee (1960) - Francesco Somma
 I piaceri dello scapolo (1960) - Ing. Rocchetti
 Black Sunday (1960) - Dr. Choma Kruvajan / Dr. Thomas Kruvajan
 Long Night in 1943 (1960) - Il farmacista
 The Thousand Eyes of Dr. Mabuse (1960) - Hoteldetektiv Berg
 Two Women (1960) - Un fascista
 Blood Feud (1961)
 The Assassin (1961) - Morello
 Akiko (1961) - Sor Egisto
 Don Camillo: Monsignor (1961) - L'esponente comunista di Roma
 Cronache del '22 (1961)
 Gold of Rome (1961) - Ortona, Giulia's father
 Erik the Conqueror (1961) - Sir Rutford
 Caccia all'uomo (1961) - Inzirillo
 Ultimatum alla vita (1962) - Un fascista
 Ten Italians for One German (1962) - Professor Marcello Rossi
 Colpo gobbo all'italiana (1962) - Orazio Menicotti
 Il sangue e la sfida (1962)
 Night Train to Milan (1962) - De Simone
 Lo smemorato di Collegno (1962) - Avvocato Rossetti
 Imperial Venus (1962) - Doctor
 Il mio amico Benito (1962) - Il commissario
 The Verona Trial (1963) - Dino Grandi
 Torpedo Bay (1963) - Micheluzzi
 Roma contro Roma (1964)
 Attack and Retreat (1964) - Colonel Sermonti
 La costanza della ragione (1964) - Lori's Father
 Super rapina a Milano (1964) - commissario Marascalco
 Revenge of The Gladiators (1964) - Gavinio
 I Kill, You Kill (1965) - Antonio (segment "Giochi acerbi")
 Challenge of the Gladiator (1965)
 I soldi (1965)
 Made in Italy (1965) - Her Husband (segment "5 'La Famiglia', episode 3")
 Me, Me, Me... and the Others (1965) - Praying Man
 Il nero (1966)
 A Bullet for the General (1967) - Don Felipe
 The Seven Cervi Brothers (1968) - the Communist Party member
 Bloody Che Contra (1969) - Selnich
 Cerca di capirmi (1970)
 Waterloo (1970) - Sauret
 Un apprezzato professionista di sicuro avvenire (1972) - Vincenzo's father
 The Godfather (1972) - Don Anthony Molinari (uncredited)
 Baciamo le mani (1973)
 Una donna per 7 bastardi (1974) - Old Man

References

External links

1916 births
1974 deaths
Actors from Florence
Italian male actors
Place of death missing
Centro Sperimentale di Cinematografia alumni
Nastro d'Argento winners
20th-century Italian male actors
Accademia di Belle Arti di Firenze alumni